Pentwyn Deintyr is a small Welsh community between Quakers Yard and Nelson, Caerphilly.
The name Pentwyn Deintyr (= pen twyn (y) deintyr, top of the hill of the tenterhooks) is a link with the early woollen industry in the district.
The name originates where tenterhooks were used in the process of stretching the wool.

Notable residents
World flyweight boxing champion Jimmy Wilde was born in Pentwyn Deintyr.

Villages in Merthyr Tydfil County Borough